Antonio Ramón López Gómez (born 1974) is a Catalan politician and a member of the Parliament of Catalonia for the Vox party.

Gómez was born to a Catalan family in Lérida. Before entering politics he worked as a mechanic at a garage owned by his parents before becoming a real estate developer. He was one of eleven Vox deputies elected to the Catalan Parliament in 2021 and was elected for the Lérida constituency. During his election campaign, Gómez complained to the authorities that his car had been repeatedly attacked with rocks and claimed Catalan separatists and far-left activists were the culprits.

In-line with Vox's official stance, Gómez is opposed to Catalan independence, calls for a zero tolerance approach to illegal immigration and wants better working conditions for public sector employees. In the Catalan Parliament he also sits on the committees for climate action and urban planning.

References

1974 births
Living people
Politicians from Catalonia
Vox (political party) politicians
Members of the 13th Parliament of Catalonia